Viktor Rossi (born 31 October 1968 in Bern) is a Swiss politician and civil servant. A member of the Green Liberal Party, he became Vice-Chancellor of Switzerland on 1 May 2019.

Biography
Rossi attended primary and secondary school in the canton of Bern, apprenticed as a cook between 1084 and 1987, obtained a maturity diploma in economics at the Private school Humboldtianum in Bern, before attaining a teacher's degree in Law and Economics at Bern Universityin 1996. In 2015, he completed a diploma of Advanced Studies in Law at Bern University.
After graduating, he started teaching Trade at the commercial school (BFB) in Biel, before leading the school in 1999. In parallel, he was at first vice-president of the conference of rectors of commercial schools in the Canton Bern between 2004 and 2009, then president in 2009.

Rossi joined the Federal Chancellery of Switzerland in October 2010, leading the Records Management and Logistics department. In 2015 he was Federal Chancellor Walter Thurnherr's delegate supervisor for the IT project GENOVA.
In December 2018, the Federal Council elected Viktor Rossi Vice-Chancellor of Switzerland. He took office on 1 May 2019 and has been leading the Federal Council's affairs.

Viktor Rossi is a native German and Italian speaker. He is married and father of two.

References 

1968 births
Living people